|}

The Leisure Stakes is a Listed flat horse race in Great Britain open to horses aged three years or older.
It is run at Windsor over a distance of 6 furlongs and 12 yards (1,218 metres), and it is scheduled to take place each year in late May or early June.

The race was run at Lingfield Park until 2000.

Winners since 1982

See also 
Horse racing in Great Britain
List of British flat horse races

References 

 Paris-Turf: 
Racing Post: 

Flat races in Great Britain
Windsor Racecourse
Open sprint category horse races